Mrigayaa is a 1976 Indian historical drama film directed by Mrinal Sen and produced by K. Rajeshwara Rao. It is based on an Odia short story by Bhagbati Charan Panigrahi, called "Shikaar". The film portrayed the relationship between the British colonial government and native villagers, and their exploitation by Indian landlords in 1920s India. It also depicts the friendship between a British administrator, who has a flair for game hunting, and a native tribal, who is an expert archer. The lead actors, Mithun Chakraborty and Mamata Shankar, both made their cinematic debuts through the film.

The film score was provided by Salil Chowdhury, while K. K. Mahajan handled the cinematography. At the 24th National Film Awards, Mrigayaa won two awards—Best Feature Film and Best Actor. It also won the Filmfare Critics Award for Best Movie apart from being nominated for the Golden Prize at the 10th Moscow International Film Festival in 1977.

Plot
The plot is set in the 1930s and the film is about a group of tribals who live in a small village in Odisha amidst wild animals like tigers and boars. Apart from the problems faced by the animals that ruin the harvest, they also suffer at the hands of the greedy moneylenders and police informers. Around this time, a newly posted British administrator arrives at the village who happens to be passionate on hunting. He befriends Ghinua, a native tribal who is also an exceptional archer. The two get into a deal where Ghinua will be rewarded if he brings down a "big game".

The story then focusses on Sholpu, a young revolutionary who surreptitiously comes into the village to meet his mother. Knowing this, the police informer chases him down till he reaches his house, but returns after seeing the whole village turn against him. However, he waits for his turn to punish Sholpu. Suddenly there is a robbery in the village and one policeman is killed. The blame falls on Sholpu and the administrator declares a reward for his head. The informer takes the opportunity and kills Sholpu, thereby claiming the reward. Sholpu's death creates a tension between the tribals and non-tribals. During this time, Dungri, Ghinua's wife, is abducted by a moneylender. Ghinua kills the moneylender to bring his wife back. Thinking that the time has come for the "big game", he goes happily to meet the Sahab, the administrator. The Sahab, however, hangs him for committing a murder. Till his death, Ghinua fails to understand why for the same action one is rewarded while the other is punished.

Cast

Themes and influences
The film was based on Shikar, a short story by Odia writer Bhagbati Charan Panigrahi. Set in the 1930s, during the apogee of the Indian independence movement, the tale describes the lives of a tribal community who lead a tough life in a small odisha village. While the original story was set in the 1930s, the script is set in the backdrop of a rebellion on the lines of the Santhal revolt that took place in the 1850s; Sen claimed that the story "could have happened anytime, anywhere". The theme of the villagers' facing a tough time in the form of wild animals, and cruel moneylenders on the other hand are connected in the opening sequence where a boar is seen destroying the crops, following which a moneylender arrives.

Production

Sen, who was making political films till then, decided to experiment on films that focus on personal relationships. He decided to film a village-based story. He incurred heavy losses from his previous venture Chorus (1974). He was not able to repay the loan owing to the film's financial failure. Mrigayaa was produced by K. Rajeshwara Rao. It was Sen's first colour film, and for the role of Ghinua, he wanted to cast a henman. Unable to find one, he happened to come across Mithun Chakraborty in one of his teaching sessions at the Film and Television Institute of India where the latter was a student. For the female lead, another newcomer, danseuse Mamata Shankar, Uday Shankar's daughter, was cast as Dungri. The post-production work was done at Madras.

Music
"Gaye Garua Se Bharti Hai" - Mohammed Rafi, Pankaj Mitra
"Suhag Reek Atauri Chetna Ko" - Mohammed Rafi, Pankaj Mitra

Reception
Mrigyaa was an average grosser at the box office. It received mixed responses from the critics and audience, who did not like the idea of mixing "story with history". While Mithun's portrayal as a tribal fetched him unanimous acclaim, Shankar's performance was noted as being tense. The performances of rest of the cast that includes Sadhu Meher, Samit Bhanja and Sajal Roy Chowdhury were well received.

Awards

Notes

References

External links

About the film on Mrinal Sen's official website

1976 films
1970s Hindi-language films
Films directed by Mrinal Sen
Films featuring a Best Actor National Award-winning performance
Best Feature Film National Film Award winners
Films scored by Salil Chowdhury
Films based on short fiction